Robert William Howard (born 15 September 1999) is an English footballer who plays as a midfielder for Welling United.

After playing youth football for Southend United, Arsenal and Colchester United, Howard started his career at Harlow Town, on loan from Southend United, making his debut in 2019. Loan spells at Dartford and Braintree Town followed, before making his senior debut for Southend United in League Two in December 2020. He joined King's Lynn Town on loan in March 2021 and spent the remainder of the season at the club.

Early life
Born in Chelmsford, Howard grew up in Billericay.

Career

Early career
Howard started his youth career at Southend United at the age of 11, before joining Arsenal as a 14-year-old. He joined Colchester United in 2016, signing a two-year scholarship in May of that year, but was released in 2018 at the end his scholarship deal.

Return to Southend United
Howard returned to Southend United on a one-year deal in July 2018. Howard joined Harlow Town on loan for the remainder of the season in March 2019, for whom he made 5 appearances. The club activated an extension clause in his contract at the end of the 2018–19 season. He joined Dartford on a month-long loan in August 2019, and made 7 league appearances. He joined Braintree Town on loan in January 2020, for whom he made 4 league appearances. He was offered a new one-year contract with the option of a further year in summer 2020. He made his senior debut for the club on 19 December 2020 in a league win over Mansfield Town. On 22 March 2021, Howard joined National League side King's Lynn Town on loan until the end of the season. Having made his debut for the club the following day, starting in a 3–0 league defeat away to Altrincham, Howard made 16 appearances for King's Lynn Town across his loan spell. On 11 February 2022, Howard joined Southern League Premier Division South side Farnborough on loan for the remainder of the 2021–22 season.

Welling United
On 3 June 2022, Howard signed for Welling United.

Career statistics

References

External links
 

1999 births
Living people
English footballers
Sportspeople from Chelmsford
Association football midfielders
Southend United F.C. players
Arsenal F.C. players
Colchester United F.C. players
Harlow Town F.C. players
Dartford F.C. players
Braintree Town F.C. players
King's Lynn Town F.C. players
Farnborough F.C. players 
Welling United F.C. players
English Football League players
National League (English football) players
Isthmian League players
Southern Football League players